HMIS Kistna (U46) was a Black Swan-class sloop which served in the Royal Indian Navy (RIN) during World War II.

After independence, she was commissioned into the Indian Navy as INS Krisna.

History

HMIS Kistna was ordered under the 1940 Build Programme on 10 September 1941. She was built by Yarrow (Shipbuilders), Limited and commissioned in 1943.

With World War II underway, she was soon deployed for convoy escort duties between the UK and West Africa. In November 1943, while escorting a convoy to Liverpool, the convoy was sighted by German aircraft. Wolfpack Schill was formed to attack the convoy, which was repelled by the escorts, including HMIS Kistna.  was hit by a torpedo and took major damage in the attack. A mercantile vessel being escorted was sunk and another damaged by German aircraft with Hs 293 glider bombs.

HMIS Kistna was transferred to the Eastern Fleet and continued to escort convoys en route to Bombay. In the Eastern Fleet it continued escort duties in the Persian Gulf, the Bay of Bengal and the Indian Ocean. It supported military operations by the British Indian Army and the British Army in Burma.

It continued to provide naval gunfire support as a part of the operation.

After a refit in Bombay, in April 1945, she was part of the amphibious assault group for the Indian 26th Division on Rangoon during Operation Dracula.

In July, Kistna was deployed for minesweeping operations to the Malacca Straits during Operation Collie. In August, she conducted preparatory exercises to participate in Operation Zipper to recapture Malaya.

At the end of World War II, Kistna was in Penang during the Japanese surrender there.

After India's independence, she was commissioned into the Indian Navy as INS Krisna. She was a part of the 12th Frigate Squadron, before being used for training purposes. She was decommissioned in 1981 and scrapped.

Notes

References

External links

Black Swan-class sloops of the Royal Indian Navy
1943 ships
Training ships of the Indian Navy